Shamim Farooqui (25 December 1943 – 29 August 2014) was an Urdu poet from India.

Early life 
He was from Bihar, India. He did his schooling from Gumla High School and did M.A. in Urdu from Ranchi University.

Published work 
 Zaiqa Mere Lahoo Ka

See also
 List of Indian poets
 List of Urdu language poets

References

1943 births
2014 deaths
Urdu-language poets from India
20th-century Indian poets
Poets from Bihar
People from Gaya, India
Indian male poets
20th-century Indian male writers